McGluwa is a surname. Notable people with the surname include:

 Harold McGluwa, South African politician
 Joe McGluwa (born 1963), South African politician

See also
 McLuhan
 McLucas
 McLuckie
 McGlynn

Surnames of African origin
Surnames of British Isles origin
Surnames of European origin